Parmentiera is a genus of plants in the family Bignoniaceae.

Species include:
 Parmentiera aculeata (Kunth) L. O. Williams — guajilote (Mexico, Guatemala, Honduras, Costa Rica, Belize, El Salvador, Nicaragua)
 Parmentiera cereifera Seem. — candle tree (Panama)
 Parmentiera dressleri A. H. Gentry (Panama, Costa Rica)
 Parmentiera macrophylla Standl. (Costa Rica, Panama, Nicaragua)
 Parmentiera millspaughiana L. O. Williams (Mexico, Nicaragua)
 Parmentiera morii A. H. Gentry (Panama)
 Parmentiera parviflora Lundell (Mexico, Guatemala)
 Parmentiera stenocarpa Dugand & L. B. Sm. (Colombia)
 Parmentiera trunciflora Standl. & L. O. Williams (Nicaragua)
 Parmentiera valerii Standl. (Costa Rica)

References

 
Bignoniaceae genera
Taxonomy articles created by Polbot